Acacia microcalyx is a shrub belonging to the genus Acacia and the subgenus Phyllodineae that is endemic to western Australia.

Description
It has ash-grey to pale green coloured, rigid, erect to ascending branchlets that are generally straight and are sparingly divided with obscure ribs. Like most species of Acacia it has phyllodes rather than true leaves. It blooms from February to June and produces cream flowers.

Distribution
It is native to an area in the Mid West and Goldfields-Esperance regions of Western Australia where it is commonly situated on floodplains and stony plains growing in sandy, loamy and clay loam soils. The bulk of the population is found around Shark Bay but the range extends to the east as far as Mount Magnet in the north east and Belele Station in the south east where it is commonly found as a part of Acacia scrubland communities or with species of Atriplex or Halosarcia.

See also
List of Acacia species

References

microcalyx
Acacias of Western Australia
Taxa named by Bruce Maslin
Plants described in 1974